Filip Filipović (born 2 May 1987) is a Serbian water polo player widely considered to be one of the greatest players in the history of the sport. He was a member of the Serbia men's national water polo teams that won bronze medals at the 2008 and 2012 Olympics and gold medals in 2016 and 2020. He also held the world title in 2009 and 2015 and the European title in 2003, 2006, 2012, 2014, 2016 and 2018. He was named Most Valuable Player at the 2011 World Championships. He was also voted as the male water polo "World Player of the Year" in 2011, 2014 and 2021 by the FINA magazine. He played for Pro Recco in Italy and won three LEN Champions League and three LEN Super Cup with them. Currently, he plays for Olympiacos.

Filipović was given the honour to carry the national flag of Serbia at the opening ceremony of the 2020 Summer Olympics in Tokyo, becoming the 26th water polo player to be a flag bearer at the opening and closing ceremonies of the Olympics.

Club career

Pro Recco
In February 2010. Filip and his Pro Recco teammate Udovičić were guests in Soria. They played an all-stars humanitarian match between Italy and the selection of foreigners playing in the Italian championship, and all proceeds from the match went to charity – to help Haiti, the victims of the recent devastating earthquake. Caps of all players were offered for sale at a symbolic price of 30 euros. It was confirmed on 29 June 2011 that Filip and his teammates from Pro Recco will play in Adriatic Water polo League.

2011–12 season
In the second round of the Adriatic League, on 24 September, Filipović scored his first goal against Koper Rokava in a 16–4 home win. On 1 October 2011. Filipović scored two goals in the Adriatic League, in a 10–7 third round away win against Jug CO. On 15 October Filipović scored a goal in the fifth round of the Adriatic League, in a 15–8 home win against Primorje EB. On 22 October Filipović scored two goals in the first round of the Euroleague Group in an easy 13–5 win over Spartak Volgograd. On 29 October, in the Adriatic League seventh round 13–9 home win against Mladost, Filipović scored two goals. On 26 November Filipović scored a goal in the Euroleague third round, in a 10–8 win against Jadran Herceg Novi. Filipović scored two goals on 3 December in a humiliating 21–0 defeat over POŠK in the twelfth round of the Adriatic League. In the thirteenth round on 10 December, Filipović scored another two goals against Mornar Split in a 20–8 away win. On 8 February 2012. in the fifth round of the Euroleague, Filipović scored two goals in a 15–7 win against CN Marseille. 3 days later he scored another two goals but in the Adriatic League fifteenth round 9–8 home win against Jug CO. He scored one more in a win over Primorje EB by 13–6 on 18 February, in the sixteenth round. On 25 February, in the last round of the Euroleague group stage, Filipović was the top scorer in the 18–7 away win against Spartak Volgograd with five goals. Four days later, Filipović scored another five goals but in the Adriatic League fourteenth-round game behind, in a 21–5 easy home win over Mornar BS. On 3 March Filipović scored two goals in a 12–7 Adriatic League away win against Mladost, the second goal was his 20th so far.

National career
Filip finally scored his first two goals on 17 January at the European Championship against Germany in the second game which the Serbs won by a score of 13–12. On 19 January, in the third game of the tournament, Filipović scored two goals in a big 15–12 victory against rivals and defending European champions Croatia. He will also remember the match for the unsportsmanlike conduct of Croat Nikša Dobud who deliberately struck him from behind, resulting in serious bruising underneath Filipović's right eye. Filipović responded by scoring two goals against the Croatians and waving the Serbian three-finger salute at the Croatian bench. On 27 January Filipović scored three goals in a semifinal 12–8 victory over Italy. Filip Filipović won the 2012 European Championship on 29 January. He scored a goal in the final against Montenegro which his national team won by 9–8. This was his third gold medal at the European Championships.

Filipović was the joint top goalscorer at the 2016 Rio de Janeiro Olympics, with 19 goals.

Honours
Filipović has played for the Serbia and Montenegro  / Serbia national team more than 381 times and has scored more than 677 goals. He has 35 medals with his national team, the most notable being gold medals representing Serbia at the World Championships in 2009 Rome and 2015 Kazan, as well as gold medals and individual MVP awards at the Olympics in 2016 Rio de Janeiro and 2020 Tokyo.

Club
Partizan
 Serbian Championship: 2006–07, 2007–08, 2008–09
 Serbian Cup: 2006–07, 2007–08, 2008–09
Pro Recco
 LEN Champions League: 2009–10, 2011–12, 2014–15 ; runners-up: 2010–11,  2017–18
 LEN Super Cup: 2010, 2012, 2015
 Adriatic League: 2011–12
 Serie A1: 2009–10, 2010–11, 2011–12, 2014–15, 2015–16, 2016–17, 2017–18, 2018–19
 Coppa Italia: 2009–10, 2010–11, 2014–15, 2015–16, 2016–17, 2017–18, 2018–19

Radnički Kragujevac
 LEN Euro Cup: 2012–13
LEN Champions League runners-up: 2013–14
Szolnok Vízilabda
 LEN Euro Cup: 2020–21
Hungarian Championship: 2020–21
Olympiacos
Greek Championship: 2021–22
Greek Cup: 2021–22, 2022–23

Awards
 FINA "World Player of the Year" award: 2011, 2014, 2021
 Swimming World Magazine's man water polo "World Player of the Year" award: 2016, 2021
Waterpolo-World Magazine's man water polo "World Player of the Year" award: 2015
 LEN "European Player of the Year" award: 2009, 2014, 2016, 2018, 2021
Member of the World Team of the Year's 2000-2020 by total-waterpolo
Member of the World Team 2018, 2021  by total-waterpolo
 Sportsman of The Year by the Serbian Olympic Committee: 2016, 2021
 Serbia's sport association "May Award" : 2007
 World Championship Top Scorer: 2009 Rome
 World Championship MVP: 2011 Shanghai
 World League Top Scorer: 2011 Firenze
 Olympic Tournament 2012 London Team of the Tournament
 World League Top Scorer: 2014 Dubai
 LEN Champions League Top Scorer: 2013–14 with Radnički Kragujevac
 Olympic Tournament Top Scorer: 2016 Rio de Janeiro
 Olympic Tournament MVP: 2016 Rio de Janeiro
 Olympic Tournament 2016 Rio de Janeiro Team of the Tournament
 Olympic Tournament MVP: 2020 Tokyo
 Olympic Tournament 2020 Tokyo Team of the Tournament
 European Championship MVP: 2018 Barcelona 
 World League MVP: 2019 Belgrade
 Hungarian Championship MVP: 2020–21 with Szolnok
Greek Championship MVP: 2021–22  with Olympiacos

Personal life
Filipović is married to Sanja and has son and daughter.

See also
 Serbia men's Olympic water polo team records and statistics
 List of Olympic champions in men's water polo
 List of Olympic medalists in water polo (men)
 List of men's Olympic water polo tournament top goalscorers
 List of flag bearers for Serbia at the Olympics
 List of world champions in men's water polo
 List of World Aquatics Championships medalists in water polo

References

External links

 
 
 

	

1987 births
Living people
Sportspeople from Belgrade
Serbian male water polo players
Water polo drivers
Left-handed water polo players
Water polo players at the 2008 Summer Olympics
Water polo players at the 2012 Summer Olympics
Water polo players at the 2016 Summer Olympics
Water polo players at the 2020 Summer Olympics
Medalists at the 2008 Summer Olympics
Medalists at the 2012 Summer Olympics
Medalists at the 2016 Summer Olympics
Medalists at the 2020 Summer Olympics
Olympic gold medalists for Serbia in water polo
Olympic bronze medalists for Serbia in water polo
World Aquatics Championships medalists in water polo
European champions for Serbia and Montenegro
European champions for Serbia
Competitors at the 2005 Mediterranean Games
Competitors at the 2009 Mediterranean Games
Competitors at the 2018 Mediterranean Games
Mediterranean Games medalists in water polo
Mediterranean Games gold medalists for Serbia
Mediterranean Games bronze medalists for Serbia
Olympiacos Water Polo Club players
Serbian expatriate sportspeople in Greece
Serbian expatriate sportspeople in Italy
Expatriate water polo players